Thierry Hupond (born 10 November 1984) is a French former road bicycle racer, who competed professionally between 2008 and 2017 for the  and  teams.

Born in Décines-Charpieu, Rhône, Hupond became professional with Skil-Shimano in 2008, having been a stagiaire with the team in late 2007. In the 2008 Paris–Nice, he wore the mountains classification jersey for one day on stage three, having broken away from the field during stage two, building up a lead of fifteen minutes at one point. As a result, he claimed all the mountain points available.

Career achievements

Major results

2009
 3rd Münsterland Giro
2010
 4th Les Boucles du Sud Ardèche
2011
 2nd Les Boucles du Sud Ardèche
 8th Hel van het Mergelland
2014
 1st Stage 4 Four Days of Dunkirk
2016
 10th Overall La Méditerranéenne

Grand Tour general classification results timeline

References

External links

1984 births
Living people
People from Décines-Charpieu
French male cyclists
Université Savoie-Mont Blanc alumni
Sportspeople from Lyon Metropolis
Cyclists from Auvergne-Rhône-Alpes